Vitaliy Romanyuk (born 22 February 1984 in Keszthely, Hungary) is a professional Ukrainian football defender who plays for FC Lviv in the Ukrainian Premier League.

External links
Profile on Official FC Lviv Website
Profile on EUFO
Profile on Football Squads

1984 births
Living people
Sportspeople from Keszthely
Ukrainian footballers
FC Hazovyk-Skala Stryi players
FC Lviv players
FC Karpaty Lviv players
Ukrainian Premier League players
Association football defenders